The 1925 Kansas State Wildcats football team was an American football team that represented Kansas State Agricultural College as a member of the Missouri Valley Conference (MVC) during the 1925 college football season. In its sixth season under head coach Charlie Bachman, the team compiled a 5–2–1 record (3–2–1 against conference opponents), won the conference championship, and outscored opponents by a total of 70 to 43.

Schedule

References

Kansas State
Kansas State Wildcats football seasons
Kansas State Wildcats football